Whipsaw Creek is a creek in the Similkameen region of British Columbia.  The creek flows into the Similkameen River from the west and is approximately  upriver from Princeton, British Columbia. The Crowsnest Highway, Highway 3, makes a dangerous hair pin bend around the creek banks to avoid the defile.  Whipsaw Creek has been mined for gold.

References

Rivers of British Columbia
Similkameen Country
Yale Division Yale Land District